Valeriya is a stage name of Alla Yurievna Perfilova (born April 17, 1968 in Atkarsk), a Russian singer and fashion model. Valeriya, who is a recipient of the titles People's Artist of Russia (2013) and People's Artist of the Pridnestrovian Moldavian Republic (2016), has also won numerous awards, including Golden Gramophone (thirteen), Pesnya goda (thirteen), Muz-TV (four: Best Performer in 2004, 2010 and 2015, Best Video, 2014), and MTV Russia Music Awards (two, Best Performer, 2004, Best Song, 2005). She has been a member of the Council for Culture and Art under the President of the Russian Federation since 2012.

Biography
Valeriya was born on April 17, 1968 in a town of Atkarsk in the Saratov Oblast.

Career
In 1985 Valeriya enrolled in the Gnessin State Musical College in Moscow which she graduated 1990. 

In 1989 Valeriya recorded two albums. Her first English-language disc, The Taiga Symphony came out in 1991 via Shulgin Records. Pobud' so mnoi (Stay with me), a collection of traditional Russian romances, was released by Lad Records a year later. In 1992 she won the first prize in a national TV contest Morning Star. Also that year she won the international contest Bratislavskaya Lira and received an Audience Choice Award at Yurmala-92.

In 2005 Valeriya was awarded the Honoured Artiste of Russia title and ranked 9th in the Forbes magazine list of 50 most highly paid people in movie, sport, literature and music industry. 

In March 2009 Valeriya was invited to join as a special guest Simply Red's "The Greatest Hits" Tour in the UK. She also took part in the Russian National Final for Eurovision 2009 with the song "Back to Love" and later finished second behind "Mamo" by Anastasia Prikhodko. In 2010, Valeriya joined forces with Avon as a celebrity judge for Avon Voices, Avon's first ever global, online singing talent search for women and songwriting competition for men and women.

Valeria's 2013 studio album Po serpantinu featured four duets (with Valery Meladze, Nikolai Baskov, Alexander Buynov and, notably, Goran Bregovich, one of her all-time favourite artists). Most of the reviews, though, centered on the Russian chanson-tinged title track and "I Will Be Waiting for You", the latter included into the comedy Polar Flight soundtrack. It was followed by the Best Of compilation Eto vremya lyubvi (This Is the Time of Love), which included "Ty moya" (You Are Mine), the duet with her daughter Anna Shulgina.

Valeriya's 2016 studio album Okeany served well to "prove the singer's intention to remain a 'a healthy man's perfect female singer'," but her "'formula of happiness' here is here being pronounced with the strictness of a harsh pedagogue," according to critic Alexey Mazhayev. The material for her 2017 studio album K solntsu (Towards the Sun) has been provided by the team of young, unknown songwriters, including Cyrill Yermakov from Belarus, "but if the idea was to bring in the feeling of freshness, it succeeded only in fragments," according to Mazhayev. Highly successful though proved to be the singles "Minor Infarctions" and "The Heart Is Broken". The video for the latter gathered 112 million views on the YouTube in the first week.

Activism
Public activities and statements of the singer have triggered and still trigger mixed, at times even strident response in the neighboring (to Russia) countries.

Personal life
Valeriya has been married three times. Her first husband was Leonid Yaroshevsky, her second husband was Alexandr Shulgin. She is currently married to Iosif Prigozhin. Valeriya lives in Moscow.

Discography

Studio albums
1992 — Pobud' so Mnoi (Stay With Me)
1992 — The Taiga Symphony
1995 — Anna
1997 — Familia. Chast' 1 (Family Name. Part 1)
2000 — Perviy Internet Albom (First Internet Album)
2001 — Glaza Tsveta Neba (Eyes the Colour Of Heaven)
2003 — Strana Lyubvi (Loveland)
2006 — Nezhnost' Moya (My Tenderness)
2008 — Nepodkontrolno (Out Of Control, also the title of this album's English version)
2010 — Vo Mne Moya Lubov' (My Love Inside Me)
2013 — Po serpantinu (Upon the Serpentine)
2016 — Okeany (Oceans)
2017 — K Solntsu (Towards the Sun)

Compilation albums
1999 — Samoye Luchsheye (The Very Best)
2010 — Pesni, Kotorye Vy Polyubili (The Songs You've Come to Love)

Singles

 "The Sky Belongs to Me" 1992
 "Stay With Me" 1992
 "My Moscow" 1995
 "S dobrim Utrom!" ("Good Morning!" 1995)
 "Moskva slezam ne verit" (Moscow Does Not Believe in Tears, 1995)
 "Samolet" (Airplaine, 1995)
 "Obichnie Dela" (Business as Usual, 1995)
 "Noch nezhna" (Tender Is the Night, 1997)
 "Popolam" (In Halves, 1997)
 "O tom chto bilo" (Of What Has Been, 1997}
 "Jal" (Sorry, 1997)
 "Ty gde to tam" (You're Somewhere Else, 1999)
 "Tsvety" (Flowers, 1999)
 "Snowstorm" 2000
 "Riga - Moscow" 2000
 "Taju" (I'm melting, 2000)
 "Ne obijay menya" (Don't Put Me Down, 2001)
 "Ne obmanyvai" (Don't Lie, 2001)
 "Bolshe chem zhizn" (Larger Than Life, 2001
 "Malchiki ne plachyt" (Boys Don't Cry, 2001)
 "Bila lubov" (There Was Love, 2003)
 "Chasiki" (Small Watch, 2003)
 "Pereley voda" (Running Waters, 2003)
 "Raduga duga" (Rainbow, 2003)
 "Cherno Beliy Tsvet" (Black and White, 2003)
 "Obo mne ne vspominay" (Forget About Me, 2003)
 "Ti grustish" (You're Sad, duet with Stas Pjekha, 2004)
 "Otpusty menya" (Let Me Go, 2006)
 "Prosto tak" (Just So, 2006)
 "Malenkiy samolet" (Little Airplane, 2006)
 "Ot lubvi do razluky" (From Love Till the Parting, 2006)
 "Ty poimesh" (You'll Understand, 2006)
 "Nejnost moya" (My Tenderness, 2006)
 "Rasstavanie" (The Parting, with Stas Pjekha 2006)

 "Break It All" (2007)
 "Mi vmeste" (We Are Together, 2008)
 "Chelovek dozhdya" (The Rain Man, 2008)
 "The Party's Over" (2008)
 "Wild" (2008)
 "Stayin' Alive" (Valeriya and Robin Gibb, 2008)
 "Nikto kak ty" (Nobody But You, 2009)
 "Back to Love" (2009)
 "All That I Want" (2010)
 "Zhdi menya" (Wait for Me, 2010)
 "Until You Love You" (2011)
 "Podruga" (Girl Friend, 2011)
 "Sokhraniv ljubov" (Keeping the Love Alive", 2011, with Nikolai Baskov)
 "Ya tebya otpustila" (I've Let You Go, 2011)
 "Po serpantiny" (Over the Serpantine, 2012)
 "Ya budu zhdat tebya" (I Will Be Waiting for You, 2012)
 "Ne teryai menya" (Don't Lose Me, 2013, with Valery Meladze)
 "Moi lyubimy" (My Beloved, 2014)
 "Serdtse iz stekla" (Heart of Glass, 2014, with Ruslan Alekhno)
 "Eto vremya lyubvi" (This Is the Time of Love, 2014)
 "Ty moya" (You Are Mine, 2014, with daughter Anna Shulgina)
 "Zabyvai menya" (Start to Forget Me, 2015)
 "Formula stchastya" (Formula of Happiness, 2015)
 "Silnyie zhenshchiny" (Strong Women, 2015)
 "Telo khochet lyubvi" (The Body Wants Love, 2016)
 "Okeany" (Oceans, 2016)
 "Lyubov ne prodayotsya" (Love Is Not for Sale, 2016, with Kristina Orbakaite)
 "Za minutu do snega" (A Minute Before the Snowfall, 2016, with Oleg Gazmanov)
 "Mikroinfarkty" (Minor Infarctions, 2017)
 "Svet moyikh glaz" (Light of My Eyes, 2017)
 "Serdtse razorvano" (The Heart Is Broken, 2017)

Books
 2006 — Tears and Love (autobiography, Azbuka-klassika)
 2010 — Yoga with Valeriya (self-help, Eksmo)

Awards

State awards

 2003 — The Order "For the Revival of Russia"
 2005 — The title Merited Artist of the Russian Federation
 2013 — The title People's Artist of Russia (2013) 
 2018 — Order of Friendship

Music awards
 1992 — Morning Star TV contest, winner
 1992 — International contest Bratislavskaya Lira, winner
 1992 — Jurmala-92, Audience Choice Award 
 1993 — Russian Union of Journalists, Person of the Year
 1994 — Song of the Year TV Festival, laureate, with "Business as Usual"
 1995 — Song of the Year TV Festival, laureate, with "Airplane"
 2000 — Hit-FM Award, "Metelitsa"
 2000 — Song of the Year TV Festival, laureate, "Riga-Moscow"
 2000 — Golden Gramophone national prize for "Riga-Moscow"
 2001 — Alexander Popov Professional National Prize, Radio Favorite of the Year
 2001 — Record- 2001, "Riga-Moscow"
 2001 — Song of the Year TV Festival, laureate with "I Am Melting". Also: Klavdiya Shulzhenko Prize, Singer of the Year
 2003 — 7 Days magazine Awards, Best Female Act, Best Looking Female Act
 2003 — Golden Gramophone, for "Chasiki" (Small Watch), Song of the Year
 2003 — Song of the Year TV Festival, with "Chasiki"
 2003 — Business People 2003 contest, laureate
 2004 — Muz-TV Awards 2004, Best Female Act
 2004 — MTV Russia Music Awards 2004, Best Female Act
 2004 — Record 2004, Radio Hit of the Year, "Chasiki"
 2004 — Golden Gramophone, "Black and White"
 2005 — MTV Russia Music Awards, Best Duet, "You Are Sad", with  Stas Piekha
 2005 — Golden Gramophone, for "You Are Sad"
 2006 — "Golden Gramophone", Brilliant voice of Russia, for "My Tenderness"
 2007 — Record 2007, Radio Hit of the Year, for "My Tenderness"
 2007 — Song of the Year TV Festival, laureate, with "We Are Together"
 2007 — Golden Gramophone for "We Are Together"
 2007 — Olympia Prize (from the Russian Association of Businesswomen)
 2008 — Golden Gramophone for "The Rain Man"
 2008 — The Ovation Award, the Best Vocalist
 2008 — ZD Awards, Best Artist, Best Video
 2008 — Olympia Prize, from the Russian Association of Businesswomen
 2008 — Song of the Year TV Festival, laureate, with "The Rain Man"
 2009 — ZD Awards, Best Female Act, Best Video
 2009 — Golden Gramophone for "Nobody Like You"
 2009 — Song of the Year TV Festival, Klavdia Shulzhenko Prize, Singer of the Year
 2010 — Muz-TV Awards 2010, Best Female Act
 2010 — ZD Awards, Best Artist
 2011 — Golden Gramophone for "Bird of the Parting"
 2011 — Song of the Year TV Festival, Best Duet, "Keeping the Love", with Nikolai Baskov
 2012 — Song of the Year TV Festival, "I've Let You Go", with Igor Krutoi
 2012 — Stars of the Road Radio, laureate
 2012 — RU.TV, Best Duet, "Keeping the Love", with Nikolai Baskov
 2013 — Song of the Year TV Festival, for "Do Not Lose Me", with Valery Meladze
 2014 — Muz-TV Awards 2014, Best Video for "Do Not Lose Me", with Valery Meladze
 2014 — Golden Gramophone for "We Are Afraid to Love"
 2014 — Song of the Year TV Festival, with "Time to Love"
 2014 — Stars of the Road Radio, laureate
 2015 — Muz-TV Awards 2015, Best Artist of the decade
 2015 — Muz-TV Awards 2015, Best Duet, for "You Are Mine" with Anna Shulgina
 2015 — MUSICBOX-2015, Best Duet, for "You Are Mine" with Anna Shulgina 
 2015 — First Russian National Music Prize, for "I've Let You Go"
 2015 — Golden Gramophone Jubilee, for "Riga-Moscow" 
 2015 — RU.TV, Best Dance Track for "This Is the Time of Love"
 2015 — Song of the Year TV Festival, laureate, with "The Formula of Happiness"
 2016 — Stars of the Road Radio, laureate
 2016 — Song of the Year TV Festival, laureate, with "Oceans"
 2016 — Fashion Summer Awards, the Stylish Female Act 
 2016 — Fashion People Awards, Artist of the Year
 2016 — MUSICBOX-2017, Best Duet, "Love Is Not for Sale", with Kristina Orbakaitė
 2016 — Chanson of the Year, for "He and She", with Alexey Glyzin
 2018 — Zhara Music Award, Collaboration of the Year, "Chasiki" with Egor Kreed

References

External links

Official website
 

1968 births
Living people
People from Saratov Oblast
20th-century Russian singers
21st-century Russian singers
Russian pop singers
Gnessin State Musical College alumni
People's Artists of Russia
Honored Artists of the Russian Federation
UNICEF Goodwill Ambassadors
20th-century Russian women singers
21st-century Russian women singers
Russian National Music Award winners
Winners of the Golden Gramophone Award